The 1875 Mid Surrey by-election was fought on 24 November 1875.  The byelection was fought due to the resignation (Justice of the Court of Appeal) of the incumbent Conservative MP, Richard Baggallay.  It was won by the Conservative candidate Sir Trevor Lawrence who was unnoposed.

References

1875 elections in the United Kingdom
1875 in England
19th century in Surrey
By-elections to the Parliament of the United Kingdom in Surrey constituencies
Unopposed by-elections to the Parliament of the United Kingdom in English constituencies
November 1875 events